Sharan Kaur was a Sikh martyr who was slain in 1705 by Mughal soldiers while cremating the bodies two older sons of Guru Gobind Singh ji, the 10th physical form of Nanak , after the Battle of Chamkaur. She was from the village Raipur Rani which is 2 km from the famous town of Chamkaur.

Guru Gobind Singh ji moved on from the fort of Chamkaur on the night of December 25, 1704. Guru Sahib briefly stopped at Raipur on way to Machhiwara. Here Guru Sahib ji asked a lady by the name of Bibi Sharan Kaur to perform the last rites of the martyred Sikhs, which included two of Guru Gobind Singh ji's own sons, Sahibzada Ajit Singh and  Sahibzada Jujhar Singh. Bibi Sharan Kaur performed the last rites of the two elder Sahibzadas and other Sikh warriors who had laid down their lives in the battle. According to an account, Bibi Sharan Kaur was slain by Moghul soldiers and thrown in the funeral pyre of Sahibzadas, when she and her other accomplices from Raipur, were witnessed cremating the bodies of Sahibzadas.

Bibi Sharan Kaur’s husband Bhai Pritam Singh, who was a Khalsa warrior, was with Guru Gobind Singh ji, inside the Chamkaur fort resisting the Moghul attack/onslaught. She discovered her husband among the dead. In total she is said to have collected bodies of thirty-two Khalsa soldiers, including the two elder Sahibzadas. She tried to cremate them in a single funeral pyre. As soon as the funeral pyre was lit she was discovered by Moghul and Ranghar soldiers who wanted the bodies of the “Shaheed” Khalsa soldiers - martyrs according to warrior tradition -  to rot in open air in order to  terrorise non-Muslim population who refused to apostasize or give out the whereabouts of Guru Gobind Singh ji. Another school of thought, is of the viewpoint that Bibi Sharan Kaur understood the intentions of the Moghul soldiers to outrage her modesty, she jumped into the funeral pyre of Sikh warriors, which included her own husband, to save her honour.

This village has the funerary shrines or 'smadhs' of the following Sikh martyrs: Jathedar Naunihal Singh, Mastan Singh, Santokh Singh and Malkiat Singh. In 1945 a Gurudwara was built in village Raipur to commemorate Bibi Sharan Kaur.

See also 
Battle of Chamkaur

References 

Executed Indian people
Indian women in war
People executed by the Mughal Empire
History of Sikhism
Sikh martyrs
Women in 18th-century warfare